Rebecca Ann Kleefisch (née Reed; born August 7, 1975) is an American politician and former television reporter who served as the 44th Lieutenant Governor of Wisconsin from 2011 to 2019. A member of the Republican Party, she was elected to the position on November 2, 2010, as the running mate of Governor Scott Walker; the pair narrowly lost reelection to a third term in 2018.

Kleefisch was a candidate in the 2022 Wisconsin gubernatorial election, but lost the Republican nomination to businessman Tim Michels in the August 9 primary.

Early life, education, and career
Rebecca Ann Reed was born in Pontiac, Michigan. Her family later relocated to Ohio, where she won the Miss Ohio Teen USA 1994 title. On August 16, 1994, she competed in the nationally televised Miss Teen USA 1994 pageant as Miss Ohio Teen USA in Biloxi, Mississippi, but did not place in the competition. Reed graduated from the University of Wisconsin–Madison. She was a reporter for WIFR-TV in Rockford, Illinois, and then was a reporter and later morning anchor for WISN-TV in Milwaukee, before leaving in 2004. Kleefisch formed her own company, Rebecca Kleefisch Enterprises and was a contributor to Charlie Sykes' program on WTMJ Radio in Milwaukee.

Political positions

Abortion 
Kleefisch supports Wisconsin's 1849 abortion ban that went into effect in 2022 after the Dobbs v. Jackson Women's Health Organization decision by the United States Supreme Court eliminated the constitutional right to an abortion in the United States. The law bans abortion in all instances except to save the life of the mother. Kleefisch believes that abortion should be illegal in all other instances, including after rape or incest, or to protect the health of the mother. She also wrote that she agrees with Sharron Angle that raped women should "turn lemons into lemonade" by having their rapist's child.

Marriage rights 
Kleefisch has indicated support for same-sex marriage, acknowledging her views have changed since she compared same-sex marriage to marrying a dog or an inanimate object in 2010, comments she later called a "poor choice of words." By 2022, Kleefisch said "I am in the same place that I would say as a vast majority of Wisconsinites and Americans are. My opinion has changed…gay marriage will be legal when I am governor of Wisconsin."

Health care 
Kleefisch opposes the Affordable Care Act (ACA) and has supported efforts to repeal the legislation. She has called the ACA "an abomination."

Other positions 
Kleefisch criticized Wisconsin's progressive income tax system and has promised "transformational income tax reform" if she were to become governor. She suggested eliminating taxes on retirement income.

Kleefisch is open to paid family leave, saying "we need to make sure that moms and dads have time to bond with their babies. That's absolutely something that I would look at as governor."

In 2009, Kleefisch said that there is "no consensus that people have caused climate change."

In 2012, when she faced a recall election, Kleefisch criticized the recall process, arguing that it has become a "spectacle" and were designed only to recall officials guilty of grave wrongdoing, rather than used as a way to resolve policy disputes. In 2021, however, Kleefisch championed the recall election of four Mequon-Thiensville School District over policy disputes. In 2022, she proposed removing some election-related powers from the bipartisan Wisconsin Elections Commission and transferring them to the state Department of Justice, headed by the elected state attorney general.

In 2020, she praised Donald Trump's trade policies, as well as his handling of the COVID-19 pandemic. After Trump lost the 2020 presidential election and made false claims of fraud while refusing to concede, she defended Trump's false claims of fraud.

In 2021, she called for a ban on sanctuary cities, as well as a ban on the teaching of critical race theory in public schools.

Lieutenant Governor of Wisconsin
Although Kleefisch's husband Joel had been a member of the Wisconsin State Assembly since being elected in 2004, Kleefisch's own first entry into politics began when she ran for Lieutenant Governor in 2010. During her Republican primary campaign, Scott Jensen was her strategist; she made appeals to conservative talk radio hosts and Tea Party groups, as well as social conservatives and the Christian right, circulating a flier saying that, if elected, she would be "relying on the wisdom and faith she has in Jesus." In the primary election, she defeated four rivals, including Brett Davis, who had support from the party establishment and was favored by Scott Walker, the Republican candidate for governor. In the November 2010 general election, she won election on a single ticket as Walker's running mate.

Kleefisch spent eight years as lieutenant governor under Walker. Along with Walker, Kleefisch played a major role in supporting and promoting the $3 billion incentive package to Foxconn.
 
In 2018, Kleefisch claimed that her campaign opponent Mandela Barnes was kneeling during the U.S. national anthem protests at the Wisconsin State Fair. She later apologized for making the claim.

2012 recall

Following a contentious collective bargaining dispute in 2011, an effort began to recall Walker and Kleefisch. After examining petitions, the Wisconsin Government Accountability Board determined there were more than 800,000 valid signatures to hold a recall election. In the June 5, 2012 recall election, Walker and Kleefisch were retained in office. Kleefisch is the only lieutenant governor in the history of any state in the United States to face recall election and ultimately survive a recall.

Post-lieutenant governorship
In January 2019, Kleefisch was appointed to serve as the executive director of the Women's Suffrage Centennial Commission. She served in that position until becoming a Jobs Ambassador for Associated Builders and Contractors of Wisconsin in November 2019. As a jobs ambassador, she promotes careers in the skilled construction trades.

2022 gubernatorial campaign

In September 2021, Kleefisch announced that she would seek the Republican nomination for Governor of Wisconsin in the following year's election. In her announcement, she likened herself to Donald Trump. She began her campaign by criticizing the leadership of incumbent Democratic Governor Tony Evers and attacking his response to the 2020 Kenosha unrest. In October 2021, she told Republicans that they needed to "hire mercenaries" and engage in "ballot harvesting" (a practice she has called for banning) to help her win the 2022 race. In November 2021, she said that a vaccine requirement for poll workers in Wisconsin was intended to prevent Republicans from becoming poll workers and thus hide wrongdoing. Kleefisch recently sued the Wisconsin Elections Commission, alleging that they broke the law during the 2020 election.

During her campaign, Kleefisch initially recognized that Biden won the 2020 election but by early 2022, she declined to take a position on the matter. In April 2022, Kleefisch said that the election was "rigged." On decertifying the results of the 2020 election in Wisconsin, Kleefisch said it is "not constitutionally possible."

Personal life
Kleefisch is married to former State Representative Joel Kleefisch, who was also a reporter for WISN-TV. They have two daughters. They lived in Oconomowoc, located 16 miles west of Waukesha, Wisconsin, and were members of Crosspoint Community Church, a Christian & Missionary Alliance-affiliated megachurch in Oconomowoc. Since losing re-election, Kleefisch and her family moved to Concord, Wisconsin.

In late August 2010, Kleefisch was diagnosed with colon cancer. She had a tumor removed in early  September 2010, and finished chemotherapy treatment by April 2011.

Electoral history

See also
List of female lieutenant governors in the United States

References

External links

Campaign website
 

1975 births
21st-century American politicians
21st-century American women politicians
American evangelicals
American television news anchors
American television reporters and correspondents
Journalists from Wisconsin
Lieutenant Governors of Wisconsin
Living people
Politicians from Milwaukee
Radio personalities from Milwaukee
University of Wisconsin–Madison alumni
Wisconsin Republicans
Women in Wisconsin politics
American women television journalists
American beauty pageant winners
Beauty queen-politicians